Gabriel Siria Levario (4 September 1931 – 19 April 1966), known professionally as Javier Solís, was a Mexican singer and actor. He specialized in the musical genres of bolero and ranchera.

Early life
Gabriel Siria Levario was the first of three children of Francisco Siria Mora, a baker and butcher, and Juana Levario Plata, a trader. Juana had a stall at a public market and as her spouse had allegedly abandoned her, she had little time save for work. After a time, she decided to leave her son at the household of his uncle Valentín Levario Plata and his wife, Ángela López Martínez, whom Gabriel considered his real parents.

Siria had to drop out of school before his teens to support his family, after the death of his aunt Angela. Due to his aunt's death Gabriel only completed the first five years of primary school in Tacubaya in Mexico City, where he used to participate in singing contests. After dropping out of school he worked collecting bones and glass. Later he worked in a supermarket transporting merchandise. He worked as a baker, a butcher, a carpenter's helper and a car washer. In his spare time, he trained as an amateur boxer, with aspirations of going professional, but after suffering a few defeats, he was urged to work at something "more decent".

Singing career
Solis began singing in competitions under the pseudonym of "Javier Luquín" in which the winner would be awarded a new pair of shoes; he was eventually banned from participating because he so dominated the competition. At that time he was working as a butcher, and sang while he worked. His boss, David Lara Ríos, heard him and was so impressed with his talent that he urged Siria to dedicate himself to his music and recommended him to a voice coach, even paying for singing lessons with Noé Quintero.

At age 16, Solis went to Puebla to sing with the Mariachi Metepec, but he did not get his first professional break until two years later when Julito Rodríguez and Alfredo Gil of the famous singing trio, Los Panchos, discovered him and took him to audition at CBS Records. There in 1950, he signed a contract and recorded his first album. He was singing at the same time at the Teatro Lirico in Mexico City when he met dancer Blanca Estela Saenz who would later become his wife. His first hit, "Llorarás", came two years later, and it was his then-producer Felipe Valdes Leal who gave Siria his stage name, "Javier Solís".

Solís began to receive international acclaim in 1957 when he began appearing in the United States and Central and South America. He was among the first artists to sing in the new style now known as bolero-ranchera. He sang boleros typically associated with trio music but which now were accompanied by mariachis. Solís was a versatile interpreter singing not only boleros, but rancheras, corridos, danzones, waltzes, and tangos, among others. His hit recordings included "Sombras", "Payaso", "Vereda Tropical", "En Mi Viejo San Juan", and "Amanecí En Tus Brazos", the latter a re-recording of the hit written and recorded by José Alfredo Jiménez.

Acting career
Solís began his acting career in 1959 and appeared in more than 20 films, working with such artists as Pedro Armendáriz, María Victoria, Antonio Aguilar, and Lola Beltrán. His last movie, Juan Pistolas, was finished in 1965, the same year that his film, Sinful, was released. During his lifetime, he was considered a better singer than actor by his public, who rated him alongside such accomplished artists as Jorge Negrete and Pedro Infante who with Solis, made up the "Three Mexican Roosters" of Mexican music and cinemas.

Final years and death
Following the 1957 death of Pedro Infante in a plane crash in Mérida, Yucatán, Solís experienced a surge of popularity, not least because he was considered the last of the "Three Mexican Roosters" who along with Infante and Jorge Negrete, had been the idols of Mexican music and cinema. Between 1961 and 1966 (the year of his death), he had 12 No. 1 hits on the Mexican charts.

On 12 April 1966 (only seven days before his death), Solís performed the song "Perdóname mi vida" live on a TV Show, making notorious pain gestures during the performance. On 19 April 1966, Solís died at the age of 34 in Mexico City from complications due to gallbladder surgery. He is buried in the Panteón Jardín cemetery in Mexico City, Mexico.

Legacy
Javier Solís was a prolific artist, leaving an extensive discography, and like Infante, most of his albums are still in print.

See also
 Recuerdo a Javier Solís

References

External links
 
 Lyrics of selected songs
 

1931 births
1966 deaths
20th-century Mexican male singers
20th-century Mexican male actors
Male actors from Mexico City
Mexican male film actors
Ranchera singers
Singers from Mexico City